The 30th edition of the Asian Amateur Boxing Championships was held from April 19 to 26, 2019 in Bangkok, Thailand. It was the first time in the tournament's history that men and women fought in the same championship.

Medal summary

Men

Women

Medal table

References

External links
Results

2019
Asian Boxing
International boxing competitions hosted by Thailand
boxing
Asian Amateur Boxing Championships
Asian Amateur Boxing Championships